Colin Mathieson is a Paralympic athlete from Canada competing in the 100 meter, 200 meter & 400 meter.

Colin Mathieson is a 4 time Canadian  Paralympian from Winnipeg Manitoba, Canada. Colin has competed on the Canadian national team since 1995.  Colin has competed in 4 Paralympic Games 1996,2000,2008, 2012 with a medal in 1996 in the 4 × 400 m relay. In addition to his Paralympic accomplishments he has also won 3 bronze medals from the IPC World Championships (2002, 2013) and a silver medal from the 2006 IPC European Championships in Helsinki. Colin also holds several Canadian Championship titles from 1994 to 2014.

References

Paralympic track and field athletes of Canada
Athletes (track and field) at the 1996 Summer Paralympics
Athletes (track and field) at the 2000 Summer Paralympics
Athletes (track and field) at the 2008 Summer Paralympics
Paralympic bronze medalists for Canada
Living people
Medalists at the 1996 Summer Paralympics
Year of birth missing (living people)
Paralympic medalists in athletics (track and field)
Canadian male wheelchair racers